Babar Ali (born 8 November 1986) is a Pakistani first-class cricketer who plays for Multan cricket team.

References

External links
 

1986 births
Living people
Pakistani cricketers
Multan cricketers
Cricketers from Multan